Raffaello Bertieri (1875–1941) was a publisher, graphic designer, and type designer from Florence, Italy. Bertieri began working as a printer's apprentice in 1886 and by 1902 was an editor in Milan. He began publishing Il Risorgimento Grafico (Renaissance of the Graphic Arts) even before founding his own printing and publishing house, Bertieri & Vanesetti, which gained notoriety by publishing the works of Gabriele d'Annunzio, and renowned for its edition of L'arte di G B Bodoni. Many of his books won prizes, most notably at the hugely influential Paris Exposition of 1925.

Fonts Designed by Raffaello Bertieri
All fonts cast by the Nebiolo type foundry.
Inkunabula (1921), based on a Roman of Erhard Ratdolt.
Sinibaldi (1926)
Paganini (1928), designed by Alessandro Butti under Bertieri's direction.
Iliade (1930)
Ruano (1933)

References
Jaspert, W. Pincus, W. Turner Berry and A.F. Johnson. The Encyclopedia of Type Faces. Blandford Press Lts.: 1953, 1983. .
Friedl, Ott, and Stein, Typography: an Encyclopedic Survey of Type Design and Techniques Throughout History. Black Dog & Levinthal Publishers: 1998. .

1875 births
1941 deaths
Italian art directors
Italian graphic designers
Italian typographers and type designers